Mysterious Skin: Music from the Film is an album of music composed and performed by Robin Guthrie and Harold Budd for the film Mysterious Skin. The music was published on a CD inside a digipak containing images from the film.

Critical reception
AllMusic wrote that "the soundtrack plays as a piece, with a moody, yet darkly alluring mood prevailing throughout ... should please fans of ambient, post rock experimentation, and smart, well-executed film music." The Austin Chronicle called the music "ethereal," writing that it "subtly enriches the sense of mystery that lies at the movie’s core." Vice called it "both gorgeous and sad."

Alex Ross, in The New Yorker, wrote: "Harold Budd and Robin Guthrie, in their score for the new Gregg Araki film Mysterious Skin, do something wholly unexpected: as a horrendous story of child abuse in a Kansas town unfolds, the music sways toward a state of irrational bliss, as if to numb the pain."

Track listing 
 "Neil's Theme" – 2:14
 "The Memories Returning" – 2:08
 "Snowfall" – 6:30
 "Neil's Farewell" – 2:31
 "Childhood Lost" – 2:38
 "Halloween" – 3:18
 "A Silhouette Approaches" – 2:28
 "Goodbye to Wendy" – 2:46
 "Brian's Nightmare / The Unknown, Part One" – 4:04
 "Twilight" – 3:46
 "The Unknown, Part Two" – 2:11
 "The Discovery" – 2:27
 "Loitering" – 3:38
 "The Writing on the Wall" – 1:50
 "One True Love" – 2:32

References 

Robin Guthrie albums
Harold Budd albums
2005 albums
2005 soundtrack albums
Ambient albums
Drama film soundtracks